Crazy is a 2007 Spanish comedy film directed by Juan Luis Iborra which stars Silvia Abascal, Verónica Forqué, and Concha Velasco alongside Jordi Rebellón, Asunción Balaguer, Juli Mira, Iván Sánchez, and Elisa Matilla.

Plot 
Blanca has met the man of her life, but he has mysteriously vanished. She embarks in a crazy investigation across the city (a Madrid whose streets are always under construction), teaming up with her aunt Bárbara (married to a municipal councillor responsible for Urbanism) and a fed-up actress (Nuria).

Cast

Production 
The screenplay was penned by Juan Luis Iborra alongside Antonio Albert. The film is an El Paso PC, Cuarteto PC, Hispanocine PC and Notro Films production. Joaquín Manchado was responsible for the cinematography and José Reinoso for the score. Shooting took place in Madrid, beginning on 19 March and wrapping on 20 June 2007.

Release 
The film received a pre-screening in December 2007 in L'Alfàs del Pi. It was presented at the Málaga Film Festival's official selection on 9 April 2008. It was theatrically released in Spain on 11 April 2008.

Reception 
Francisco Griñán of Diario Sur assessed that insofar the film aims to entertain it manages to do so sometimes, also adding that the light (yet also "bland") comedy based on the comedy talent of Abascal and Forqué (great in a tailor-made role) sometimes features scenes that are taken to such an extreme that they do not hold up.

Jonathan Holland of Variety wrote that "in spite of a few moments of authentic wit and a lively perf from Veronica Forque in a role tailored for her, little elevates this above any number of other well-honed farces".

Accolades 

|-
| align = "center" | 2008 || 11th Málaga Film Festival || Best Costume Design || Pepe Reyes ||  || align = "center" | 
|}

See also 
 List of Spanish films of 2008

References 

Films set in Madrid
2007 comedy films
2007 films
Spanish comedy films
2000s Spanish-language films
Films shot in Madrid
2000s Spanish films